Jonathan Svedberg (born 22 March 1999) is a Swedish footballer who plays for Halmstads BK.

References

External links 
 

Swedish footballers
Allsvenskan players
1999 births
Living people
Halmstads BK players
Association football midfielders